Samuel Tuia (born 24 July 1986) is a French volleyball player, a member of France men's national volleyball team and Turkish club İstanbul Büyükşehir Belediyesi, a silver medalist of the European Championship 2009, Polish Champion (2014).

Career

Clubs
Season 2013/2014 spent in Polish club - PGE Skra Bełchatów, Polish Champion 2013/2014. In July 2014 moved to Turkish club Galatasaray FXTCR.

National team
He debuted in French national team in 2008. He won silver medal of European Championship 2009.

Sporting achievements

Clubs

National championships
 2009/2010  French Championship, with AS Cannes Volley-Ball
 2013/2014  Polish Championship, with PGE Skra Bełchatów

National team
 2009  CEV European Championship

References

External links 
FIVB Profile
PlusLiga profile

Living people
1986 births
French men's volleyball players
French expatriate sportspeople in Poland
Expatriate volleyball players in Poland
Polish Champions of men's volleyball
AZS Olsztyn players
Skra Bełchatów players
Wallis and Futuna men's volleyball players
Beşiktaş volleyballers
Galatasaray S.K. (men's volleyball) players